Mercado, located within Old San Juan, is one of 7 subbarrios in San Juan Antiguo  barrio in the municipality of San Juan in Puerto Rico.

History
The name of this subdistrict comes from the Spanish word for marketplace, as Old San Juan's main marketplace used to be located here.

The United States took control of Puerto Rico from Spain in the aftermath of the Spanish–American War under the terms of the Treaty of Paris of 1898. In 1899, the United States conducted its first census of Puerto Rico, finding that the population of Mercado was 2,038.

See also

 List of communities in Puerto Rico

References

Old San Juan, Puerto Rico
Geography of San Juan, Puerto Rico